Aeau Leota Tima Leavai (born ~1960) is a Samoan lawyer and politician. She is the daughter of former MP A'eau Peniamina.

Leavai is a lawyer who runs her own law firm. She contested the April 2021 Samoan general election in her father's seat of Falealupo as a candidate for the Human Rights Protection Party, and won the seat. On 29 June 2021 the Samoa Observer reported that she planned to resign her seat and not run again, as part of the settlement of an electoral petition. She formally resigned on 9 July.

In June 2020 Leavai was awarded the Aeau title by her village.

References

Living people
Members of the Legislative Assembly of Samoa
Human Rights Protection Party politicians
Samoan women in politics
Samoan lawyers
21st-century women politicians
Year of birth missing (living people)